Mordellistena frosti is a beetle in the genus Mordellistena of the family Mordellidae. It was described in 1918 by Liljeblad.

References

frosti
Beetles described in 1918